PTFC or P.T.F.C. may refer to:
 Partick Thistle Football Club, in Glasgow, Scotland
 Portland Timbers Football Club, American soccer club in Portland, Oregon
 Portland Thorns Football Club